Gustavinho em... o Enigma da Esfinge (English: "Gus in... the Sphinx Enigma") is a 1996 Brazilian educational adventure video game developed by 44 Bico Largo and created by Ale McHaddo. The plot revolves around the adventures of Gustavinho, who travels through Eurasia on a quest to return home, meeting historical figures like Julius Caesar and Cleopatra along the way.

In commemoration of the game's 20th anniversary, it was remade on iOS in 2013 and Android in 2017, with HD graphics and new dubbing.

Development 
According to Ale McHaddo, the game was developed with the aim of stimulating children's reasoning skills in a playful way.

Marisa Orth, who played Cleopatra as an full-motion video character, was dressed by São Paulo label School of Divine.

Critical reception 
At the time of release, the game was one of the country's best selling point-and-click games. It sold around 60,000 copies in Brazil, a significant number at the time.

References

External links 
 Facebook page
 Homepage 

Android (operating system) games
1996 video games
Educational video games
DOS games
IOS games
Point-and-click adventure games
Video games developed in Brazil
Depictions of Julius Caesar in video games